Montepio may refer to:
Montepío, a village in Veracruz, Mexico
Montepio (bank), a Portuguese banking company

See also
Mount of piety, a charitable institution
Nacional Monte de Piedad, a charitable institution